Mount Maloney is a mountain,  high, standing  north of Mount Alice Gade at the southeast side of Bowman Glacier, in the Queen Maud Mountains of Antarctica. It was discovered and mapped by the Byrd Antarctic Expedition, 1928–30, and was named by the Advisory Committee on Antarctic Names for John H. Maloney, Jr., a meteorologist with the South Pole Station winter party, 1960.

References

Mountains of the Ross Dependency
Amundsen Coast